"Who's in the House" was a novelty song and hit single by Fr. Brian and the Fun Lovin' Cardinals. It reached number three in the Irish Singles Chart, and spent 12 weeks in the top 40 in 2000. 

The song came from Brendan O'Connor's satirical character "Fr. Brian" on Don't Feed the Gondolas (a comedy game show shown on RTÉ in the late 90s). A rap style song, it parodies the Catholic Church's attempts to be "cool" and "down with the kids" and contains the immortal chorus: "Who's in the House? Jesus in the House". It is unrelated to the 1993 American Pentecostal Christian Rap song of the same name by Carman despite having the exact same name and the nearly identical lyrics of "Who's in the house? J.C! Jesus Christ is in the house!".

Both songs are essentially responsible for the popularity of the "Jesus in the house" lyric, one in Ireland and the other in the United States.

Charts

Weekly charts

See also
 List of one-hit wonders in Ireland

External links
 Profile: Brendan O'Connor From The Sunday Times
 O'Connor's Sunday Independent article about "Who's In The House?"
 

Criticism of Christianity
Irish novelty songs
2000 songs
2000 singles